Sir John Musgrove, 1st Baronet (21 January 1793 – 5 October 1881) was a British businessman and Lord Mayor of London.

Musgrove was the only son of John Musgrove, of Hackney, a London merchant. He was an auctioneer and house agent and had made his fortune by 1824 by taking advantage of rising property prices in London. He served as Master to The Clothworkers' Company in 1843–44, and again in 1862.  He was Sheriff of London between 1843 and 1844 and Lord Mayor of London between 1850 and 1851. He was created a baronet, of Speldhurst in the County of Kent and of Russell Square in the County of Middlesex, in 1851.

Musgrove died at Rusthall House, Speldhurst, Kent, in October 1881, aged 88. The title died with him.

References

1793 births
1881 deaths
Sheriffs of the City of London
Baronets in the Baronetage of the United Kingdom
19th-century lord mayors of London
19th-century English politicians
Businesspeople from London
People from Speldhurst
19th-century English businesspeople